The Samoan National Development Party (SNDP) was a political party in Samoa, and the country's main opposition party between 1988 and 2003.

The party was formed from a merger of the Christian Democratic Party and Samoa National Party in April 1988. At the 1991 election the party won 17 of 47 seats, and party leader Tupua Tamasese Efi lost his seat. They won 13 seats at the 1996 election. At the 2001 election the party won 23.5% of popular votes and 13 out of 49 seats. 

In 2003 the party merged with the Samoan United Independents Political Party to form the Samoan Democratic United Party, which replaced it as the main opposition party of Samoa. At the time of the merger, the party was led by Le Mamea Ropati.

References

Political parties in Samoa
Political parties established in 1988
Main